Governor Pacheco may refer to:

Enrique Dávila Pacheco (15??–1663), Acting Governor of Yucatán, Governor of Nueva Vizcaya and Governor of Tlaxcala
Ivonne Ortega Pacheco (born 1972), Governor of Yucatán from 2007 to 2012
José Condungua Pacheco (born 1958), Governor of Cabo Delgado Province, Mozambique, from 1998 to 2005 
Romualdo Pacheco (1831–1899), 12th Governor of California
Rondon Pacheco (1919–2016), Governor of Minas Gerais, Brazil, from 1971 to 1975
Víctor Cervera Pacheco (1936–2004), Governor of Yucatán from 1984 to 1988

See also
Alonso de Pacheco de Herédia (fl. 1640s), 12th Spanish Governor of New Mexico